National Lampoon The Job of Sex: a Workingman's Guide to Productive Lovemaking is a humorous book that was first published in 1974. It was a spin-off from National Lampoon magazine. The book was a parody of the 1972 book, The Joy of Sex. The parody was written by several of the National Lampoon's regular contributors, and was edited by Brian McConnachie.

References

 Amazon listing here

National Lampoon books
1974 books
Parody books